Zoran Prelević (born 27 December 1952) is a Serbian professional basketball coach and former player.

Playing career 
During his playing days, Prelević played for Radnički Belgrade, KK Vojvoda Stepa, KK Jasenica from Smederevska Palanka, and Šibenka. He retired as a player with Šibenka in 1985. 

Playing ban
In 1981, Prelević did not get an apartment from Radnički he was supposed to get under the contract, so he refused to play. Because of that, Radnički banned him permanently. A year later, Radomir Šaper and the Basketball Federation of Yugoslavia annulled the Radnički ban.

National team career 
Prelević was a member of the Yugoslavia team that won the gold medal at the 1976 Balkan Championship. Also, he was a member of the Yugoslavia university basketball team at the 1977 Summer Universiade.

Coaching career 
After retirement, Prelević was as the head coach of Mladost Zemun. In 1992, he became the head coach of Al Hala of the Bahraini Premier League. He won the Bahraini League and the National Cup in 1994. He coached Al Hala until 1995. Thereafter, he coached OKK Beograd, Al-Arabi (Qatar), Al Wahda (UAE), Al Ittihad Alexandria (Egypt), Hübner Nyíregyháza (Hungary), and Al-Shamal (Qatar).

National team coaching career 
Prelević was the head coach of Bahrain (1992–1995), Qatar U19 (2002–2003), Kuwait U19 (2003–2005), and Oman (2008–2011).

Personal life 
Prelević earned his bachelor's degree in transport engineering from the University of Belgrade in 1979. He worked as the PTT High School in Belgrade as a telecommunications teacher, from 1986 to 1991. In 1989, he earned his bachelor's degree in basketball coaching from the University of Belgrade.

Career achievements 
As player
 Yugoslav Cup winner: 1 (with Radnički Belgrade: 1975–76)

As coach
 Bahraini Premier League champion: 1 (with Al Hala: 1993–94)
 Bahraini Cup winner: 1 (with Al Hala: 1994)

References

External links 
 Zoran Prelevic at eurobasket.com
 Sportski spomenar #343
 Blog at kosmagazin.com

1952 births
Living people
Basketball players from Sarajevo
BKK Radnički players
KK Šibenik players
OKK Beograd coaches
KK Mladost Zemun coaches
Serbian men's basketball coaches
Serbian men's basketball players
Serbian expatriate basketball people in Bahrain
Serbian expatriate basketball people in Croatia
Serbian expatriate basketball people in Egypt
Serbian expatriate basketball people in Hungary
Serbian expatriate basketball people in Kuwait
Serbian expatriate basketball people in Oman
Serbian expatriate basketball people in the United Arab Emirates
Serbian expatriate basketball people in Qatar
Serbs of Bosnia and Herzegovina
University of Belgrade alumni
University of Belgrade Faculty of Sport and Physical Education alumni
Yugoslav basketball coaches
Yugoslav men's basketball players